Maurice John Pope (born 4 September 1936) is a former Australian rules footballer who played with Carlton in the Victorian Football League (VFL).

Notes

External links 

Maurie Pope's profile at Blueseum

1936 births
Carlton Football Club players
Living people
Australian rules footballers from Victoria (Australia)